Studencheskaya ( (Station of Students) ) is a station on the Leninskaya Line of the Novosibirsk Metro. It opened on December 28, 1985.

Novosibirsk Metro stations
Railway stations in Russia opened in 1985
Leninsky District, Novosibirsk
Railway stations located underground in Russia